Truth About Men is a 2010 Danish comedy drama film directed by Nikolaj Arcel.

Cast 
 Thure Lindhardt as Mads
 Tuva Novotny as Marie
 Rosalinde Mynster as Julie
  as Louise

References

External links 
 

2010 comedy-drama films
2010 films
Danish comedy-drama films
Films directed by Nikolaj Arcel
Scanbox Entertainment films
2010s Danish-language films
Films produced by Louise Vesth